Mohamed Khair Abou Hassoun (born in Syria) is a Syrian television, stage actor and voice actor. After received a Bachelor of Arts in Theater. He currently works in TV and theatre and is known for voicing characters in many anime.

Business

TV series 
Last man my mom
Ruby (2012 TV series)

Plays 
Sour grapes
Goya
Before the snow melts

Anime 
Monster Rancher
One Piece as Buggy, Captain Kuro, Arlong, Smoker, Mr. 3, Dalton, Crocodile (second voice), Johnny, Eric
Naruto as Jiraiya, Tazuna, Ibiki Morino (second voice), Black Zetsu (ep 134), Fūjin
Bakugan Battle Brawlers as Drago,   Gorem (Golem)
Bakugan Battle Brawlers: New Vestroia as Drago, Volt Luster, Zenoheld
Bakugan: Gundalian Invaders as Barodius
Hunter × Hunter as Chrollo Lucilfer, Uvogin, Tonpa, Buhara, Johness, Zepile, Dalzollene, Franklin (eps 63, 69), Kyu, Assassin A, Assassin B
Burst Ball Barrage!! Super B-Daman  
Battle B-Daman 
Shin Hakkenden
Midori no Makibaō 
Super Yo-Yo as MISTER / YO-YO SHOPKEEPER, JEEVES, Yo-Yo Devil
Dragon Ball as General White, Bacterian, Giran
Dragon Ball Z as Vegeta (eps 5, 11), Freeza, Cui, Recoome 
Dennō Bōkenki Webdiver as Gladion	
Samurai 7 as Rikichi
Peacemaker Kurogane as Susumu Yamazaki
Bakusou Kyoudai Let's & Go!! WGP as Dr. Tsuchiya
Clamp School Detectives
F
Mobile Suit Gundam Wing as Mueller
NG Knight Ramune & 40 as Don Harumage
Hakugei: Legend of the Moby Dick as Giant
Tsuyoshi Shikkari Shinasai
Goal FH 
Grander Musashi 
Special Armored Battalion Dorvack as Colonel Takagi
Virtua Fighter as Lau Chan
Aesop World
Ranma ½
Mama wa Shōgaku 4 Nensei as Adult Daisuke Yamaguchi
Detective Conan – Inspector Megure (third voice), Kazunobu Chiba, Pisco, Fumio Doi, Daisuke Shiraki, Yoshifusa Yabuuchi, Yoshikazu Watanuki, Heizo Hattori (season 3), Shuichi Akai (Seasons 5 and 6)
Idaten Jump

References

External links 
Mohammed Khair Abou Hassoun at ElCinema
 (as Mohammad Khair Abu Hassoun)
 (as Abu Mohamed Kheir Hassoun)

Living people
Syrian male television actors
Syrian male voice actors
Place of birth missing (living people)
Year of birth missing (living people)